Shadia is an Arabic feminine given name that may refer to
Shadia, Egyptian actress and singer
Shadia Drury (born 1950), Canadian academic and political commentator 
Shadia Habbal, Syrian-American astronomer and physicist 
Shadia Mansour (born 1985), British-Palestinian singer 
Shadia Marhaban, Indonesian international mediator and activist 
Shadia Simmons (born 1986), Canadian actress and teacher